Jaen, officially the Municipality of Jaen (Ilocano: Ili ti Jaen), is a 2nd class municipality in the province of Nueva Ecija, Philippines. According to the 2020 census, it has a population of 79,189 people.

History
During the Spanish Era, the municipality was only a component barrio of Gapan. When San Isidro became a town and was separated from Gapan, the town and San Antonio became one of its component barrios. When San Antonio itself became a town, the area was still its component barrio called San Agustin. By 1865, Jaen was known by its old name "Ibayong Ilog", and because there were many people in the river port in what is now Barangay Langla, the town became a centre for trade.

When the place improved and its population grew to no less than 5,000 people, it became a town through a petition filed by the inhabitants through the initiative of two early leaders, Kabesang Prudencio Esquivel and Kapitan Antonio Embuscado. On June 18, 1865, Jaen itself partitioned from San Antonio, and retained Saint Augustine of Hippo as its patron saint. The Spanish officials signed the papers granting the petition that "Ibayong Ilog" be a town in Factoria (now San Isidro) which was then the capital of Nueva Ecija. The declaration was brought to Governor-General Juan de Lara e Irigoyen in Manila, and afterwards was submitted to the Vice-General of the Philippines in the person of Rev Gregorio Martínez. Father Martínez marked the document as approved but later wrote in his own wish that the name "Ibayong Ilog" be changed to the name of his birthplace of Jaén, Spain.

In coordination with Rev Estanislao B. Moso, Kabesang Prudencio and Kapitan Antonio led the establishment of the first Catholic church (the present-day parish church). Jaen is in Central Luzon, in the southern part of Nueva Ecija. About 100 km from Manila via the old Cagayan Valley Road, the town has other road networks connecting it to Nueva Viscaya, Isabela, Pampanga, Olangapo and Bataan. In the olden days, Pampanga River was once the only and the fastest way of transportation in going to Manila and other places.

On August 24, 1896, its people revolted against the Spaniards and in September of the same year, armed with bolos and spears, ambushed and killed forty Spanish soldiers in Lumanas (now a Sitio of Barangay Santo Tomas South). This successful attack made Lumanas a historical site called "Pinagtambangan", where a marker was erected in memory of the event.

Geography
Jaén is bounded by the municipalities of Santa Rosa on the north-east; Zaragoza on the north-west; by San Isidro on the south; San Leonardo on the east and by San Antonio on the west.

Barangays
Jaén is politically subdivided into 27 barangays.

Sitios

Climate

Demographics

Economy 

Most of the north-western section of the municipality is devoted to rice farming, as rice production is the main livelihood of the populace. Twenty barangays of Jaén are fully irrigated, with about 80% of the land (approximately 9,500 hectares) being suited for rice production.

Mango plantations are found in the southern portion of the municipality. Based on the latest survey, 584 hectares are utilized for mango production, including backyard mango farms. Ten percent of the total agricultural area is for planting vegetables.

In the Población and nearby barangays, several establishments have sprouted. These include agricultural supply traders, dry goods stores, hardware stores, groceries, travel agency, fashion style, pawnshop, banks, supermarkets, gasoline stations, printing presses, and eateries. The public market is in the area.

Among the service businesses in the area are pawn shops, restaurants, auto and motorcycle parts and service, car wash, commercial center, lechon manok and liempo stand, pharmacies, computer repair shops, convenience store, bakery, petrol station, grocery, internet café, tailoring and dress shops and rural banks.

Distilled and purified water processors, mobile phone card dealers, cable and landline telephone businesses are also present in the municipality.

Professional services of doctors, accountants, dentists, lawyers, surveyors and engineers are also prevalent in the town. Most of the unemployed and out-of-school youths are given manual labor by private contractors and the local government unit, such as construction workers and street sweepers.

Education
High schools
San Agustin Diocesan Academy Inc. (formerly Luzon Central Institute, San Agustin Academy and San Agustin Parochial Academy Foundation Inc.)
Blessed Hope Christian School in Barangay Antonino (former Barangay Marcos)
Jaen National High School (near in Jaen West Elementary School former name Putlod San Jose National High School Annex) in Barangay Dampulan
Lambakin National High School (former name Putlod San Jose National High School Annex) in Brgy Lambakin
Montesorri School of Jaen Inc. (Pallarca St. Campugo, Santo Tomas South)
Putlod San Jose National High School (formerly called Putlod San Jose Barangay High School)
Marawa High School (former name Jaen National High School Annex) in Barangay Marawa
San Pablo High School (former name Jaen National High School Annex in Barangay San Pablo)

Special Schools
Olarte's School of Science & Technology Inc. in Barangay Antonino (former Barangay Marcos)
MGP School of Science in Barangay Putlod
Angel of Wisdom Interactive School (Nursery,Kinder and Prep) in Barangay Dampulan

Government
Kapitan dela Cruz was later on succeeded by an elected Municipal President, an office superseded by the title "Mayor of Jaén":
Apolinario Esquivel (1902 – 1907)
Patricio Yambao, Sr. (1916 – 1922)
Prudencio Eduardo (1922 – 1925)
Delfín Esquivel (1925 – 1928)
Patricio Yambao, Sr. (1928 – 1931)
Ambrocio Javaluyas (1931 – 1934)
Patricio Yambao, Sr. (1934 – 1937)
José C. Carlos (1934 – 1945)
Bartolome García (1945 – 1954)
Bonifacio Hipólito (1954 – 1956)
Felix E. Velarde (1956 – 1967)
Patricio Yambao, Jr. (1968 – 1971)
Felix E. Velarde (1972 – 1979)
Franklin Eduardo (1979 – 1986)
Patricio Yambao, Jr. (1986 – 1988)
Franklin Eduardo (1988 – 1992)
Antonio Esquivel (1992 – 1998)
Cezar Eduardo (1998 – 2004)
Antonio Esquivel (2004 – 2007)
Santiago R. Austria (2007 – 2016)
Sylvia C. Austria (2016 – 2020)
Antonio Esquivel (2020 – 2021)
Sylvia C. Austria (2021 – present)

Elected Officials (2010-2013)

Calabasa, Barangay Chairman: Felimon A. Aguilar
Edgardo DG. Santos
Lorenzo Q. Ilano
Benedicta P. Pelayo
Rolando V. Gabriel
Mario D. Flores
Pedro P. Fermin
Edmond A. Agapito
SK Chairman: Leonidez M. Esguerra Jr.

Dampulan (Poblacion), Barangay Chairman: Rolando P. Mangunay
Crisanto E. Matias
Jayrick C. Tagalag
Sonny E. Ignacio
Reynaldo G. De Belen
Dionisio P. Catacutan
Daisy A. Mariano
Lopito E. Dela Cruz
SK Chairman: Krisanda May G. Laureano

G.E. Antonino, Barangay Chairman: Dennis S. Pascual
Elenita D. Zantua
Mark Vic C. Pascual
Nicomedes P. Dalusong
Edwin R. Magtalas
Mario E. Rivera
Restituto R. Galang
Jennifer C. Olarte
SK Chairman: Ryan Joseph V. Parumog

Hilera, Barangay Chairman: German I. Francisco
Chrisopher C. Alfaro
Angelito P. Bauto
Pepito C. Santos
Nestor F. Reyes
Faustino L. Isidro
Benedicto G. Sebastian
Delwin C. Lustre
SK Chairman: Jomar F. Sebastian

Imbunia, Barangay Chairman: Jacinto M Capinpin
Paulino V. De Leon
David DC. Martin
Nestor DC. Ramos
Ricardo H. Antonio
Gabriel R. Duldulao
Magdalena E. Nagum
Felipa C. Padolina
SK Chairman: Germie J. Pradez

Apolinario Esquivel, Barangay Chairman: Jose A. Mendoza Jr.
Bernardo L. Villaroza
Arnel M Doncillo
Danilo M. Noveda
Edwin R. Vallarta
Angel M. Hernandez
Julian DR. Galang

SK Chairman: John Anthony D. Payumo

Lambakin, Barangay Chairman: Dionisio G. Robles
Andres DB Santor
Rizal F. Santa Ana
Marcelo DG. Mauricio
Efren V. Viesca
Rafael I. Del Rosario
Zoilo Q De Belen
Julio R. Ocampo
SK Chairman: Froilan A. Valdez

Langla, Barangay Chairman: Enrique P. San Gabriel
Reynaldo V. Padolina
Edna N. Flaminiano
Wilfredo G. Agito
Mamerto M. Del Rosario
Paquito DG. Padolina
Honorio P. Gervacio
Abraham R. San Gabriel
SK Chairman: Neil Aldrin D. Mauricio

Magsalisi, Barangay Chairman: Mercelita A. Miranda
Crisostomo A. Lazaro
Ernesto P. Mangulabnan
Agueda V. Roque
Leonardo C. Ramos
Rolando R. Rosales
Crispin C. Dalaywan
Ariel L. Lualhati
SK Chairman: Cesar C. Hizon Jr.

Malabon-Kaingin, Barangay Chairman: Roberto G. Manliclic
Conchita P. Gamboa
Victorino R. Roque
Zoilo DJ. Dela Cruz
Bartolome DC. Mendoza
Eduardo B. Padernilla
Marcelina F. Mendoza
Gloria D. Abergas
SK Chairman: Arlene B. Manalili

Marawa, Barangay Chairman: Magdalena P. Ison
Efren I. Ison
Edward I. Bauto
Adriano C. Ignacio
Myrna E. Gatuz
Avelino R. Pineda
Novy G. Bauto
Domingo DL. Velasquez
SK Chairman: Margie I. Reyes

Niyugan, Barangay Chairman: Pablito S. Pangilinan
Mario P. Dela Cruz
Elvira A. Catalan
Cesar E. Bitangcol
Ronaldo P. Balagtas
Ronaldo Q. Diaz Sr.
Alex S. Flores
Jessie F. Mateo
SK Chairman: Ryreens J. Javate

Ocampo -Rivera District (Poblacion), Barangay Chairman: Perfecto DC. Efecticio
Florencio S. Bustamante
Danilo H. Guevarra
Lourdes A. Dionisio
Robert M. Herrera
Luciana S. Herrera
Wenceslao G. Elvambuena
Melencio DC. Efecticio
SK Chairman: Ram Dominic M. Aguilar

Pakul, Barangay Chairman: Nemencio P. Gatuz
Rufino P. Pascual
Lauro B. Flores
Pascual B. Castro
Victor B. Feliciano
Celso J. Feliciano
Librado DB. Hipolito
Leoncio M. Bartolome
SK Chairman: Florence F. Bartolome

Pamacpacan, Barangay Chairman: Clifford S. Miranda
Eufronio E. Santa Maria
Delfin A. De Belen
Rommel DG. Miranda
Carlito A. Baltazar
Rogelio F. Santa Maria
Efren D. Cano
Ernesto J. Del Rosario
SK Chairman: Angelica C. Santa Maria

Pinanggaan, Barangay Chairman: Julio P. Gonzales
Eduardo F. Jorda
Rolando G. Linsangan
Felimon M. Torres
Amado B. Ubaldo
Flavio P. Casino
Sofronio M. Cuevas
Antonio P. Buenaventura
SK Chairman: Antonio G. De Guzman

Putlod, Barangay Chairman: Antonina C. Pillarina
Mario E. Bondoc
Rodel J. Valenzuela
Anselmo A. Pallanan
Restitita A. Eduardo
Elvira S. Censon
Sherwin E. Ignacio
Rizal C. Esquivel
SK Chairman: Princess Dianne E. Galang

San Jose Barangay Chairman: Leopoldo I Santos
Jerry L Laureano
Rodolfo J. Esguerra
Luisito P. Javate
Florencio S. Manalaysay
Albert E. Mangunay
Judith J. Espiritu
Gavino G. Javate
SK Chairman: Czarmaine Joyce C. Ramos

San Josef (Navao), Barangay Chairman: Elvin Jay Javaluyas
Edwin A. Jalova
Roylan A. Ignacio
Ericson DB. Espiritu
Roberto F. Parumog
Pedro R. Dionisio
Erwin M. Mariano
Rodolfo B. Diaz
SK Chairman: Arnold Joseph DJ. Martin

San Pablo, Barangay Chairman: Emmanuel S. Leabres
Eugenio G. Torres
Felimon L. Geronimo
Edgardo S. Lubao
Gregorio G. Bate
Aurea C. De Leon
Arnel S. Cabado
Benigno G. Mariano
SK Chairman: Ariane Joyce C. Santos

San Roque, Barangay Chairman: Elmer DR. Galang
Irineo R. Evangelista
Eriberto G. Pangilinan
Celso H. Castillo
Angelito B. Francisco
Rolando M. Juliano
Ramon B. Mendoza
Edna V. Reyes
SK Chairman: Joanna Marie DC. Duran

San Vicente, Barangay Chairman: Felix DB. De Luna
Ferdinand R. Gokesan
Angelica P. Paynor
Romulo S. Hipolito
Floid E. Dela Peña
Lazaro P. Dela Paz
Jose T. Gatuz
Melecio G. Hermosa
SK Chairman: Bernadette V. Paynor

Santa Rita, Barangay Chairman: Arsenio C. Santos
Raymundo B. Reyes
Wilfredo DC. Ramos
Enrico G. Tigulo
Edgardo B. Cristobal
Edgardo G. Valenton
Jimmy A. Ramos
Roberto B. Nepomuceno
SK Chairman: Wilma DC. Ador Dionisio

Santo Tomas North, Barangay Chairman: Wilson B. Santos
Babylyn Y. De Jesus
Allan Joel A. Pineda
Efren M. Yambot
Ernesto SD Yambot
Josephine J. Yambot
Norberto DG. Del Rosario
Carlos A. Cullado
SK Chairman: Christian G. De Belen

Santo Tomas South, Barangay Chairman: Reynaldo C. Pallarca
Samuel DG. Canosa
Adriano DB. Antonino
Reynaldo S. Granados
Jose P. Galang
Fermin A. Ramos
Romeo M. Rizari
Alejandro C. Balcos
SK Chairman: John Kenneth DG. Pajarillo

Sapang, Barangay Chairman: Eduardo P. Yanga
Pacencia B. Centeno
Ramon M. Daquiz
Clodualdo L. Esquivel
Lea V. Quetua
Emiliano VC. Masinag
Benedicta V. Yanga
Martinito F. Custodio
SK Chairman: Khelvin Chris E. Balisi

Ulanin-Pitak, Barangay Chairman:Wally P. Hipolito
Nelson B. Manalo
Gil H. Reyes
Sergio D. Castro
Vicente M. Mactal
Efren DL. Reyes
Manuel M. De Guzman
Felix V. Pacion
SK Chairman: Rodrigo V. Peralta
Note: No information available in Comelec for the 2013-2016 election results.

Tourism
Lolita Ilao Memorial Library: The library was donated by Mr. Tommy Ilao for the people of Jaén and is located at Barangay Dampulan, beside West Elementary School...already closed....
Pinaglabanan Marker (Lumanas, Sto Tomas South, Jaen, Nueva Ecija): The marker stands where the historical battle between the Spaniards and the people of Jaen took place on September 4, 1896. The group was led by Lt. Col. Delfin Esquivel and they used bolos, spears and several guns. It can be seen now along Sto Tomas South main road (Jaen - Santa Rosa Road) corner Sitio Lumanas (first corner to your right going to Sitio Lumanas if you going to Sto Tomas North)
Jaén Fruit and Sweets Stands: varieties of fruits in Barangay Sapang along National Highway
Lugawan stall line along Brgy Sapang
Lorenzo Farm (Place for Yard wedding or any celebration) in Brgy Dampulan
Homesite Commercial Business Center in Brgy Dampulan across Brgy Hall
Resorts:
Villa Aurora Resort (Barangay San Josef)
Golden Shower Resort (Barangay Niyugan)
Tata Guring Mini Resort (Barangay Sto Tomas South)
DelFreds Resort ( BarangaySan Pablo)
Rocky's Resort ( Sitio. Riverside, Barangay Magsalisi)
Community
Augustinian Alumni Association Jaen, N.E.

Gallery

References

External links

[ Philippine Standard Geographic Code]
Philippine Census Information
Local Governance Performance Management System 

Municipalities of Nueva Ecija
Populated places on the Pampanga River